LGA 2011, also called Socket R, is a CPU socket by Intel released on November 14, 2011. It launched along with LGA 1356 to replace its predecessor, LGA 1366 (Socket B) and LGA 1567. While LGA 1356 was designed for dual-processor or low-end servers, LGA 2011 was designed for high-end desktops and high-performance servers. The socket has 2011 protruding pins that touch contact points on the underside of the processor.

The LGA 2011 socket uses QPI to connect the CPU to additional CPUs. DMI 2.0 is used to connect the processor to the PCH. The memory controller and 40 PCI Express (PCIe) lanes are integrated on the CPU. On a secondary processor an extra ×4 PCIe interface replaces the DMI interface. As with its predecessor LGA 1366, there is no provisioning for integrated graphics.  This socket supports four DDR3 or DDR4 SDRAM memory channels with up to three unbuffered or registered DIMMs per channel, as well as up to 40 PCI Express 2.0 or 3.0 lanes. LGA 2011 also has to ensure platform scalability beyond eight cores and 20 MB of cache.

The LGA 2011 socket is used by Sandy Bridge-E/EP and Ivy Bridge-E/EP processors with the corresponding X79 (E enthusiast class) and C600-series (EP Xeon class) chipsets. It and LGA 1155 are the two last Intel sockets to support Windows XP and Windows Server 2003.

LGA 2011-1 (Socket R2), an updated generation of the socket and the successor of LGA 1567, is used for Ivy Bridge-EX (Xeon E7 v2), Haswell-EX (Xeon E7 v3) and Broadwell-EX (Xeon E7 v4) CPUs, which were released in February 2014, May 2015 and July 2016, respectively.

LGA 2011-v3 (Socket R3, also referred to as LGA 2011-3) is another updated generation of the socket, used for Haswell-E and Haswell-EP CPUs and Broadwell-E, which were released in August and September 2014, respectively. Updated socket generations are physically similar to LGA 2011, but different electrical signals, ILM keying and integration of DDR4 memory controller rather than DDR3 prevent backward compatibility with older CPUs.

In the server market, it was succeeded by LGA 3647, when in high-end desktop and workstation markets its successor is LGA 2066. Xeon E3 family of processors, later renamed Xeon E, uses consumer-grade sockets.


Physical design and socket generations 

Intel CPU sockets use the so-called Independent Loading Mechanism (ILM) retention device to apply the specific amount of uniform pressure required to correctly hold the CPU against the socket interface. As part of their design, ILMs have differently placed protrusions which are intended to mate with cutouts in CPU packagings.  These protrusions, also known as ILM keying, have the purpose of preventing installation of incompatible CPUs into otherwise physically compatible sockets, and preventing ILMs to be mounted with a 180-degree rotation relative to the CPU socket.

Different variants (or generations) of the LGA 2011 socket and associated CPUs come with different ILM keying, which makes it possible to install CPUs only into generation-matching sockets.  CPUs that are intended to be mounted into LGA 2011-0 (R), LGA 2011-1 (R2) or LGA 2011-v3 (R3) sockets are all mechanically compatible regarding their dimensions and ball pattern pitches, but the designations of contacts are different between generations of the LGA 2011 socket and CPUs, which makes them electrically and logically incompatible.  Original LGA 2011 socket is used for Sandy Bridge-E/EP and Ivy Bridge-E/EP processors, while LGA 2011-1 is used for Ivy Bridge-EX (Xeon E7 v2) and Haswell-EX (Xeon E7 V3) CPUs, which were released in February 2014 and May 2015, respectively. LGA 2011-v3 socket is used for Haswell-E and Haswell-EP CPUs, which were released in August and September 2014, respectively.

Two types of ILM exist, with different shapes and heatsink mounting hole patterns, both with M4 x 0.7 threads: square ILM (80×80 mm mounting pattern), and narrow ILM (56×94 mm mounting pattern).  Square ILM is the standard type, while the narrow one is alternatively available for space-constrained applications. A matching heatsink is required for each ILM type.

Chipsets
Information for the Intel X79 (for desktop) and C600 series (for workstations and servers, codenamed Romley) chipsets is in the table below. The Romley (EP) platform was delayed approximately one quarter, allegedly due to a SAS controller bug.

The X79 appears to contain the same silicon as the C600 series, with ECS having enabled the SAS controller for one of their boards, even though SAS is not officially supported by Intel for X79.

Compatible processors

Desktop processors 
Desktop processors compatible with LGA 2011, 2011–3 socket are Sandy Bridge-E, Ivy Bridge-E, Haswell-E and Broadwell-E.
 Sandy Bridge-E and Ivy Bridge-E processors are compatible with the Intel X79 chipset.
 Haswell-E and Broadwell-E processors are compatible with the Intel X99 chipset.
All models support: MMX, SSE, SSE2, SSE3, SSSE3, SSE4.1, SSE4.2, AVX, Enhanced Intel SpeedStep Technology (EIST), Intel 64, XD bit (an NX bit implementation), TXT, Intel VT-x, Intel VT-d, Turbo Boost, AES-NI, Smart Cache, Hyper-threading, except the C1 stepping models, which lack VT-d.
 Sandy Bridge-E, Ivy Bridge-E and Haswell-E processors are not bundled with standard air-cooled CPU coolers. Intel is offering a standard CPU cooler, and a liquid-cooled CPU cooler, which are both sold separately.

1 The X79 chipset allows for increasing the base clock (BCLK), Intel calls it CPU Strap, by 1.00×, 1.25×, 1.66× or 2.50×. The CPU frequency is derived by the BCLK times the CPU multiplier.

Server processors 

Server processors compatible with LGA 2011 socket are Sandy Bridge-EP, Ivy Bridge-E, Haswell-E and Broadwell-E.
 All models support: MMX, SSE, SSE2, SSE3, SSSE3, SSE4.1, SSE4.2, AVX, Enhanced Intel SpeedStep Technology (EIST), Intel 64, XD bit (an NX bit implementation), TXT, Intel VT-x, Intel VT-d, AES-NI, Smart Cache. Not all support Hyper-threading and Turbo Boost.

Sandy Bridge-EP (Xeon E5)

Ivy Bridge-EP (Xeon E5 v2)

Ivy Bridge-EX (Xeon E7 v2) 
All processors are released on February 18, 2014, unless noted otherwise.

Haswell-EP (Xeon E5 v3) 

Server processors for the LGA 2011-v3 socket are listed in the tables below. As one of the significant changes from the previous generation, they support DDR4 memory. All processors are released on September 8, 2014, unless noted otherwise.

Haswell-EX (Xeon E7 v3) 

Socket LGA 2011-1 is used for Ivy Bridge-EX (Xeon E7 v2) and Haswell-EX (Xeon E7 V3) CPUs, which were released in February 2014 and May 2015, respectively. All processors are released on May 6, 2015, unless noted otherwise.

Broadwell-EP (Xeon E5 v4) 

Server processors for the LGA 2011-v3 socket are listed in the tables below. These processors are built on Broadwell-E architecture, 14nM lithography, 4-channel DDR4 ECC with up to 1.5TB and 40-lanes of PCI Express 3.0. E5-16xx v4 do not have QPI links. E5-26xx v4 and E5-46xx 4 processors have 2 QPI links.

Broadwell-EX (Xeon E7 v4)

References

Intel CPU sockets